Fanja may refer to:
Fanja, a common female name in Madagascar
Fanja, Oman, or Fanjah, a populated place in Oman
Fanja, a football club